Michael John Kent (born 12 January 1951) is an English former professional footballer of the early 1970s.  He played professionally for Wolverhampton Wanderers, Gillingham and Sheffield Wednesday and made a total of 15 appearances in the Football League.

References

1951 births
English footballers
Association football forwards
English Football League players
Wolverhampton Wanderers F.C. players
Gillingham F.C. players
Sheffield Wednesday F.C. players
People from Dinnington, South Yorkshire
Living people